Gudauri is a ski resort located on the south-facing plateau of The Greater Caucasus Mountain Range in Georgia. The resort is situated in the Stepantsminda District, along the Georgian Military Highway near the Jvari Pass, at an elevation of 2,200 meters (7,200 ft.) above sea level. The resort offers high quality skiing opportunities. The slopes of Gudauri are above the tree line and considered to be avalanche-safe. The ski season lasts from December to April. Heliskiing is available throughout the season.

Heliski
Heliskiing provides skiers with almost unrestricted access to local mountains. Skiers can experience runs at altitudes between 1,500 and 4,200 meters above sea level.

Ski touring

The Gudauri Resort area and Mount Kazbek massif provide options for ski touring - is a great way to access nature as it was intended to be seen. 
The lifts provide easy access to the mountain wilderness that make this region special. With the necessary equipment and a bit of hard work, riders will be able to escape the crowds on the slopes and find some great skiing.

Speed riding and paragliding
Gudauri is Georgia's most renowned site for speedriding and paragliding. Experienced instructors are employed to accompany customers in the said activities.

Routes and lifts
Gudauri has more than 64km of ski runs and 15 lifts. The bottom station of first ski lift called pirveli is at 1,990 m above sea level and the top station of the last ski lift is at 3,279 m, called Sadzele.
The lifts are made by the Austrian-Swiss manufacturer Doppelmayr. The first lift (Pirveli) is 1,010 m long (three chairs), the second (Soliko) is 2,310 m long (four chairs) and the third (Snow Park) is 1,060 m long (three chairs). There are in overall already 15 Ski Lifts including Gondola types ("Gudaura" and "Kobi-Gudauri"): 1. PIRVELI (3 persons); 2. SOLIKO (3 persons); 3. KUDEBI (3 persons); 4. SNOW PARK (3 persons); 5. KUDEBI II (6 persons); 6. SADZELE (4 persons); 7. ZUMA (1 person); 8. GUDAURA (10 persons); 9. SHINO (6 persons); 10. ALPINA (1 person); 11. BOMBORA (1 person); 12. BABY (1 person); 13. KOBI - GUDAURI I (10 persons); 14. KOBI - GUDAURI II (10 persons) 15. KOBI - GUDAURI III (10 persons). The most recent construction Is Kobi-Gudauri 1, 2 and 3 with 7.5 km, 111 Gondola Lifts, 6 Stations and the capacity of serving 2800 passengers in an hour. The lifts work from 10:00 to 16:00, and from 9:00 to 17:00 in the later season when the day light is longer.

Accidents
On 16 March 2018, due to operator's mistake one of the chairlifts started moving backwards at twice the normal speed, creating a rollback and leaving 11 individuals with injuries.

On 29 July 2022, a police Mi-8 helicopter crashed while trying to rescue two paragliders in a gorge near Gudauri, killing all eight people on board. One of the two paragliders was also found dead.

See also
Bakuriani

References

External links

Mtskheta-Mtianeti Administration

Ski areas and resorts in Georgia (country)
Tourist attractions in the Soviet Union